Marie-Therese Connolly is an American lawyer, Coordinator at the Elder Justice and Nursing Home Initiative, at the US Department of Justice, and Senior Trial Counsel, in the Civil Division. She won a 2011 MacArthur Fellowship.

Life
She graduated from Stanford University with a B.A. in 1981, and from Northeastern University School of Law with a J.D. in 1984. She helped draft the Elder Justice Act.

She is Senior Scholar at the Woodrow Wilson International Center for Scholars. 
She is a Director of Life Long Justice at the Appleseed Foundation.

References

External links

"Read this: Marie-Therese Connolly wins MacArthur grant; Lonni Sue Johnson, artist with amnesia; women in the White House", Washington Post Reliable Source blog

American lawyers
MacArthur Fellows
Living people
Stanford University alumni
Northeastern University School of Law alumni
United States Department of Justice lawyers
American women lawyers
Year of birth missing (living people)
21st-century American women